Exotica is a musical genre.

Exotica may also refer to:

Exotica (Martin Denny album), the album that gave the musical genre its name
Exotica (Bananarama album), an album released by Bananarama
"Exotica", a song by George Benson from the album Songs and Stories
Exotica (film), the 1994 Atom Egoyan film
Exotica (book), a book by David Toop on the musical genre Exotica
Exotica (band), French electro pop duo

See also
 Cruis'n Exotica, a 1999 racing video game
Exotica Volume II, the follow-up album by Martin Denny
EXXXOTICA
Exotico, an album by Lara & Reyes